Blackler is a surname shared by several notable people:

Phyl Blackler, Phyllis Blackler (1919–1975), a New Zealand cricketer
Richard John Blackler (died 1919), founder of Blacklers department store in Liverpool, England
Stuart Blackler, Stuart Edward Blackler, (Anglican) Dean of Hobart from 1993 to 2005
William Blackler (1827–1896), horse breeder in South Australia